Active Reef is an isolated reef lying in the Firth of Tay, just off the north coast of Dundee Island. Discovered and named by Thomas Robertson, master of the Active, one of the ships of the Dundee whaling expedition of 1892–93. The Active ran onto this reef during a gale on January 10, 1893, and lay there for 6 hours before she could be gotten off.

Reefs of Graham Land
Landforms of the Joinville Island group